Picea alcoquiana is a species of conifer in the family Pinaceae. It is native only to Japan.

References

alcoquiana
Least concern plants
Trees of Japan
Endemic flora of Japan
Taxonomy articles created by Polbot